Peter Aloysius Bampton (22 June 1896 – 2 January 1968) was an Australian rules footballer who played with Port Adelaide in the SANFL during the 1920s.

Football
Bampton played a total of 137 games for Port Adelaide, often at centre half back. He made his debut during the 1919 season and was a member of their 1921 premiership side.

In 1925 he had his best season, being awarded a retrospective Magarey Medal in 1998 after originally finishing runner up on a count back.

He was Port Adelaide captain in 1927 and played his last game for the club the following season.

During his career he represented South Australia at interstate football on 10 occasions.

See also
 1927 Melbourne Carnival

Footnotes

External links

1896 births
1968 deaths
Australian rules footballers from South Australia
Port Adelaide Football Club (SANFL) players
Port Adelaide Football Club players (all competitions)
Magarey Medal winners